Big River Man is a 2009 documentary film directed by John Maringouin. It follows the Slovenian long-distance swimmer Martin Strel as he swims the entire 3,300 mile length of the Amazon River, between February and April 2007.

The film was nominated for the grand Jury Prize at the 2009 Sundance Film Festival and won the Excellence in Cinematography Award (Maringouin also shot the film). It is being distributed by Revolver Entertainment and the Discovery Channel.

Reception
The film has been almost universally praised, achieving a score of 90% by Rotten Tomatoes, as well as a score of 67 from Metacritic indicating generally favorable reviews. Critics praised the humor and story telling of the documentary and many compared it to a Werner Herzog documentary. One negative review came from Anthony Quinn of Independent, who called the on-screen chronicle of the swim "fuzzy and flaky".

Soundtrack score

2m1 Records released the soundtrack score at the beginning of 2011.  In the liner notes, 2m1 Records states: "Rich Ragsdale's wonderful musical achievement defines Martin Strel and his comedic yet serious struggle in swimming 3,300 miles down the Amazon River.  Going from a Pendereckian aesthetic to even post-rock and orchestral minimalism, this score is contagious in its ability to take you on a comedic yet dark subconscious emotional journey of Big River Man's eclectic protagonist."  In association with KNR Productions and Producer Andrew P. Alderete, 2m1 released this album through iTunes and Amazon.

External links

2009 films
American sports documentary films
Films set in the Amazon
2009 documentary films
Documentary films about sportspeople
2000s English-language films
2000s American films